Orthophytum maracasense is a plant species in the genus Orthophytum. This species is endemic to Brazil.

References 

maracasense
Flora of Brazil